KUAK-LP (102.5 FM) is a radio station licensed to serve the community of Bismarck, North Dakota. The station is owned by Dakota Media Access. It airs a variety radio format.

The station was assigned the call sign KDAK-LP by the Federal Communications Commission on February 11, 2014. The station changed its call sign to KUAK-LP on October 2, 2018.

References

External links
 Official Website
 

UAK-LP
UAK-LP
Radio stations established in 2016
2016 establishments in North Dakota
Variety radio stations in the United States
Burleigh County, North Dakota